Long Labid is a settlement in the mountainous interior of Sarawak, Malaysia.

Neighbouring settlements include:

References

Populated places in Sarawak